Panchanpur, Gaya, in the Indian state of Bihar, is situated on the state highway which connects Gaya to Tekari and Goh, Daudnagarvia. It is 6 km from Tekari sub-divisional office and 18 km from Gaya .

The village has a rich amount of geographical as well as communicative convenience as it has block and sub-divisional, office sub-divisional hospital, power grid station and the SN Sinha College at a 10-minute distance.

It is a village surrounded by mango tree gardens. While farming is the common mode of earning people are doing this work scientifically. Every type of soil is available, so it is profitable to cultivate any type of crops. Since it is near a developing town vegetable farming has a good future.

The Central University of Bihar (CUB) is one of the sixteen newly established Central Universities by the Government of India under the Central Universities Act, 2009 (Section 25 of 2009). The university is located in  Dariyapur village under Tekari block, approximately 10 km from Gaya on defence land to be transferred soon. Keeping in view of the permanent location of the University at Gaya, it has been decided to launch new academic programmes at Gaya. The area of Dariyapur is going to be developed as a place of student mobility and students from National and International places will be in huge demand for real estate and research in this area. It will be a developed area with excellent educational, infra and nature's environment. University staffs and people from many regions are continuously showing interest to settle in Dariyapur--near front(main gate) area of Central University of South Bihar.

Facts
Latitude:        24.96167
Longitude:       84.83725
Pin Code:        824236
District:        Gaya
State:           Bihar
Headquarters:          Gaya
 PIN: 824236
Population total:     5000 approx.
Subdivisions:         Tekari
Blocks:                Tekari
Agriculture:           Paddy, wheat, potato, sugarcane, vegetables
Temperature:           Minimum 0.8 (2002 AD) degree C - maximum 49.8 (1996) degree C
Industry:              Brick factory, fabricators factory, oil mills, sugar mills
Rivers:                Morher
Schools:               Urdu Prathmik Vidyalya (primary school)
 The Central University of Bihar at Panchanpur
Colleges:               S. N. Sinha College, Tekari

Places near to Panachanpur
The Central University of Bihar at Panchanpur, Rajpur: The Central University of Bihar (CUB) is one of the sixteen newly established Central Universities by the Government of India under the Central Universities Act, 2009 (Section 25 of 2009). The university is presently located at the premises of Birla Institute of Technology, Patna (BIT Campus, Patna). The university is most likely to be located at Panchanpur, approximately 10 km from Gaya on defence land to be transferred soon. Keeping in view of the permanent location of the University at Gaya, it has been decided to launch new academic programs at Gaya.
 Rameshwar BAG (garden) has a beautiful temple and a small fort with a mango garden.

Airport
An abandoned airport is between Dhār Masala, Rajpur and Fahtepur, 16 km from Gaya by bus. This airport was used during the Second World War, constructed by the British. For the last 10 years the airport has been used by only the Indian Army.
 The Gaya International Airport is operational, with Delhi, Kolkata, Varanasi and international flights.

References

Villages in Gaya district